The Flambeau Paper Company Office Building is located in Park Falls, Wisconsin. It was added to the National Register of Historic Places in 1985.

References

Office buildings on the National Register of Historic Places in Wisconsin
Office buildings completed in 1928
Buildings and structures in Price County, Wisconsin
1928 establishments in Wisconsin
National Register of Historic Places in Price County, Wisconsin